"The Adventure of the Stockbroker's Clerk" is one of the 56 short Sherlock Holmes stories written by Sir Arthur Conan Doyle. It is the fourth of the twelve collected in The Memoirs of Sherlock Holmes in most British editions of the canon,  and third of eleven in most American ones (owing to the omission of the "scandalous" "Adventure of the Cardboard Box"). The story was first published in the UK in The Strand Magazine in March 1893, and in the US in Harper's Weekly in the same month.

Synopsis

A young clerk, Hall Pycroft, consults Holmes with his suspicions concerning a company that has offered him a very well-paid job. Holmes, Watson and Pycroft travel by train to Birmingham, where the job is initially to be based, and Pycroft explains that he was recently made redundant from a stockbroking house. He eventually secured a new post with another group of stockbrokers, Mawson and Williams, in Lombard Street in the City. Before taking up the job, he was approached by Arthur Pinner, who offered him a managership with a newly established hardware distribution company, to be based in France.

Pycroft is sent to Birmingham to meet Pinner's brother and company co-founder, Harry Pinner. He is offered a very well-paid post with £100 in advance, and is asked to sign a document accepting the post, and is also asked not to send a letter of resignation to his current employers. He immediately commences his duties, but he is concerned about the unprofessional aspects of the business and their sparse offices, as well as the suspicious fact that the two Pinners have a distinctive gold filling in their teeth in the same place, suggesting that they might be the same man.

When the trio arrive at the office, on Corporation Street, Birmingham, with Holmes and Watson presented as fellow job-seekers, Pinner is reading a London newspaper and is clearly in shock. As they leave, he attempts suicide, but Watson is able to revive him. Holmes concludes that the story of the brothers is a fabrication and that there is only one 'Pinner'; lacking enough men to make their attempt to deceive Pycroft convincing, Pinner had attempted to pose as his brother to make up the numbers in the hope that Pycroft would dismiss the similarities between them as a family resemblance. He further deduces that the whole point of the exercise was to obtain an example of Pycroft's handwriting so that a 'fake' Pycroft may be employed at Mawsons (hence why they asked him to not officially resign his post). Mawsons was keeping a vast stock of valuable securities, and 'Pycroft' was to be a safebreaker.

From the newspaper, they learn that Mawson & Williams have suffered an attempted robbery, but that the criminal had been captured, although the weekend watchman has been murdered. Beddington, the forger and cracksman, was the miscreant, masquerading as Pycroft, and his brother was masquerading as Pinner.  American railway bonds worth nearly £100,000 were taken, together with a large amount of scrip in mines and other companies, but the police recovered them from the thief.

As the police are called to arrest 'Pinner', Holmes observes that "Human nature is a strange mixture, Watson. You see that even a villain and murderer can inspire such affection that his brother turns to suicide when he learns that his neck is forfeited".

Commentary
This story's plot is reminiscent of that in "The Red-Headed League", for it, too, involves an elaborate hoax designed to remove an inconvenient person from the scene for a while so that a crime can be committed. The same parallel can be seen in "The Adventure of the Three Garridebs". However, in contrast to these other two cases, the 'inconvenient person' in this case proves insightful enough to realize at least some of the deception on his own accord, whereas the other cases see Holmes being brought in to investigate more peripheral matters.

It is worth noting that Holmes is not involved in the apprehension of the thief, who has already been arrested, but is able to turn the accomplice over to the police.

Publication history 
"The Adventure of the Stockbroker's Clerk" was published in the UK in The Strand Magazine in March 1893. It was also published in the US in Harper's Weekly on 11 March 1893, and in the US edition of The Strand Magazine in April 1893. The story was published with seven illustrations by Sidney Paget in the Strand, and with one illustration by W. H. Hyde in Harper's Weekly. It was included in  The Memoirs of Sherlock Holmes, which was published in December 1893 in the UK and February 1894 in the US.

Adaptations

Film and television
The story was adapted as a short film as part of the Stoll film series. The film was released in 1922. It featured Eille Norwood as Holmes and Hubert Willis as Watson, with Olaf Hytten as Pycroft and Aubrey Fitzgerald as Pinner.

In 2018, the story was loosely adapted as "Lily of the Valley," an episode of the HBO Asia/Hulu Japan series Miss Sherlock. In this version, the false job offer is for a research position in a major pharmaceutical company.

Radio

Edith Meiser adapted the story as an episode of the radio series The Adventures of Sherlock Holmes which aired on 1 December 1930, with Richard Gordon as Sherlock Holmes and Leigh Lovell as Dr. Watson. A remake of the script aired on 11 July 1936 (with Gordon as Holmes and Harry West as Watson).

Edith Meiser also adapted the story as an episode of the radio series The New Adventures of Sherlock Holmes with Basil Rathbone as Holmes and Nigel Bruce as Watson. The episode aired on 9 November 1941.

A 1960 BBC Light Programme radio adaptation, dramatised by Michael Hardwick, aired as part of the 1952–1969 radio series starring Carleton Hobbs as Holmes and Norman Shelley as Watson. The cast also included Desmond Carrington as Pycroft and Hugh Manning as Pinner.

"The Stockbroker's Clerk" was dramatised by Denys Hawthorne for BBC Radio 4 in 1992, as part of the 1989–1998 radio series starring Clive Merrison as Holmes and Michael Williams as Watson. It featured Sean Barrett as Mr Pinner.

The story was adapted as an episode of the radio series The Classic Adventures of Sherlock Holmes, starring John Patrick Lowrie as Holmes and Lawrence Albert as Watson. The episode aired in 2015.

The story was adapted as an episode of the radio series Sunday Suspense, starring [Mir] as Holmes and [Deep]anjan as Watson. The episode aired on 16/01/2022

References
Notes

Sources

External links

Stockbroker's Clerk, The Adventure of the
1893 short stories
Works originally published in The Strand Magazine
Works originally published in Harper's Weekly